Meg Day is an American poet. They are an assistant professor of English & Creative Writing at Franklin & Marshall College. They received Audre Lorde Award and a National Endowment for the Arts Fellowship for their poem Last Psalm at Sea Level

Life  and education 
Day grew up in the San Francisco Bay Area. They earned a bachelor's degree from the University of California, San Diego.

They received a Master of Fine Arts degree from Mills College, and PhD in Literature and Creative Writing with a focus on Disability Poetics from the University of Utah, where they received the Steffensen-Cannon fellowship, a Point Foundation Scholarship, and served as the Poetry Editor for Quarterly West.

Work & style 
In 2010, Day received Lambda Literary Foundation fellow in poetry. Day has authored two chapbooks: When All You Have is a Hammer, which won the 2012 Gertrude Press Chapbook Contest, and We Can’t Read This, winner of the 2013 Gazing Grain Chapbook Contest.

In 2014, Day published their first poem Last Psalm at Sea Level  for which they won  Audre Lorde Award, Amy Lowell Poetry Travelling Scholarship, National Endowment for the Arts Fellowship and was finalist for Lambda Literary Award in Lesbian Poetry.

Along with co-editor Niki Herd, Day published Laura Hershey: On the Life and Work of an American Master in Pleiades in 2019.

Their poetry  themes and styles include Day's interest in exploring the interstitial of identity and the liminal nature of the human body. Day's poems frequently convey a theme of melancholy and nostalgia. In their poems, they frequently use line breaks, punctuation, and capitalization.

References 

Living people
Smith College faculty
Mills College alumni
University of California, San Diego alumni
University of Utah alumni
American LGBT poets
National Endowment for the Arts Fellows